The 2004 Bassetlaw District Council election took place on 10 June 2004 to elect members of Bassetlaw District Council in Nottinghamshire, England as part of the 2004 United Kingdom local elections. One third of the council was up for election.

Election result

Ward results

Beckingham

Carlton

Clayworth

East Retford East

East Retford North

East Retford South

East Retford West

Harworth

Sutton

Tuxford and Trent

Worksop East

Worksop North

Worksop North East

Worksop North West

Worksop South

Worksop South East

References

2004 Bassetlaw election result

2004 English local elections
2004
2000s in Nottinghamshire